Ladies Must Live is a 1921 American silent societal drama film directed by George Loane Tucker and released by Paramount Pictures. It was the last directorial effort of George Loane Tucker and was released four months after his death. Betty Compson stars along with Leatrice Joy, John Gilbert and Mahlon Hamilton. It was one of the few instances where future husband and wife Joy and Gilbert appeared in the same film.  

It has been considered a lost film for decades. The Library of Congress Catalog/ofHoldings lists only the 1940 Warner Brothers film of the same title.

Cast
 Robert Ellis as Anthony Mulvain
 Mahlon Hamilton as Ralph Lincourt
 Betty Compson as Christine Bleeker
 Leatrice Joy as Barbara
 Hardee Kirkland as William Hollins
 Gibson Gowland as Michael Le Prim
 John Gilbert as The Gardener
 Cleo Madison as Mrs. Lincourt
 Snitz Edwards as Edward Barron
 Lucille Hutton as Nell Martin
 Lule Warrenton as Nora Flanagan
 William V. Mong as Max Bleeker
 Jack McDonald as The Butler
 Marcia Manon as Nancy
 Arnold Gray as Ned Klegg (credited as Arnold Gregg)
 Dorothy Cumming (uncredited)
 Richard Arlen (uncredited)

See also
Betty Compson filmography

References

External links

Lantern slide; with George Loane Tucker likeness (Wayback Machine)

1921 films
1921 romantic drama films
American romantic drama films
American silent feature films
American black-and-white films
Famous Players-Lasky films
Films based on American novels
Films directed by George Loane Tucker
1920s rediscovered films
Paramount Pictures films
Films based on works by Alice Duer Miller
Rediscovered American films
1920s American films
Silent romantic drama films
Silent American drama films